The Lotus and the Storm is a novel about war and its casualties by Lan Cao. Cao is a professor of international law at the Chapman University School of Law.  She left Vietnam in 1975.

The novel tells the story about a family whose lives are inextricably bound to and altered by the tragic events that led to the fall of Saigon. The chapters alternate between the life of a once decorated soldier, whose now weak and ailing, in his home in the suburbs of Washington D.C. and that of his daughter Mai, who grew up in Saigon's twin city, Cholon.

Plot summary
Minh is a former South Vietnamese commander of the airborne brigade who left his homeland with his daughter, Mai. During the war, their lives became entwined with those of two Americans: James, a soldier, and Cliff, a military adviser. Forty years later, Minh and his daughter Mai live in a close-knit Vietnamese immigrant community in suburban Virginia. As Mai discovers a series of devastating truths about what really happened to her family during those years, Minh reflects upon his life and the story of love and betrayal that has remained locked in his heart since the fall of Saigon.

The Lotus and the Storm is a tale of people who rebuild their lives in the aftermath of war and broken promises. Despite pain and loss, they find an inner strength that restores their capacity to forgive, to love, and to live.

Advance Praise
"The Lotus and the Storm is part beautiful family saga, part coming of age story, part love story, but above all a searing indictment of the American campaign in Vietnam and its incalculable toll on generations past and future.  A powerful read from start to end."
-Khaled Hosseini, author of The Kite Runner; A Thousand Splendid Suns; And the Mountains Echoed

"Lan Cao is not just one of the finest of the American writers who spring from and profoundly understand the war in Vietnam and the Vietnamese diaspora.  She is certainly that.  She is also one of our finest American writers.  Period.  The Lotus and the Storm is a brilliant novel that illuminates the human condition shared by us all."
-Robert Olen Butler, 1993 Pulitzer Prize for Fiction

"A profoundly moving novel about the shattering effects of war on a young girl, her family, and her country. In sensuous and searing detail, Lan Cao brings Saigon’s past vividly to life through the eyes of her child narrator, Mai, following the girl and her father halfway around the world, to a suburb in Virginia, where forty years later, Mai’s trauma unravels. In this fractured world where old wars, loves and losses live on, The Lotus and the Storm is a passionate testament to the truth that the past is the present—inseparable, inescapable, enduring."
-Ruth Ozeki, author of A Tale for the Time Being

"A heart-wrenching and heartwarming epic about war and love, hurt and healing, losing and rediscovering homelands.  Through the mesmerizing voices of a Vietnamese-born father and his daughter resettled in Virginia’s "Little Saigon" after the fall of Saigon, Lan Cao dramatizes landmark battles in the Vietnam War and the toll such battles take on winners and losers.  The Lotus and The Storm establishes Lan Cao as a world class writer."
-Bharati Mukherjee, 1988 Winner of the National Book Critics Circle Award

References

External links
 Lan Cao's official website

2014 American novels
Vietnamese PEN Club
Vietnamese-American history
Novels by Lan Cao
Novels set in Virginia
Novels set in Vietnam
Novels set during the Vietnam War
Viking Press books